Otto Pierre Nicolas Berkelbach van der Sprenkel (1906 Bussum – 1978 Canberra) was a Dutch bibliographer, political scientist, and historian of China.

Early life 
Born in the Netherlands, van der Sprenkel was raised in the UK and earned First-Class Honours at the London School of Economics.

Career 
He held academic positions at the University of Toronto and  SOAS. At Nankai University on a British Council appointment. He experienced the Chinese Communist Revolution, an experience that contributed to the book he co-authored (with Michael Lindsay, 2nd Baron Lindsay of Birker and Robert Guillain) New China, Three Views (1950).

He returned to SOAS before moving to Australia to teach at the Canberra University College in 1956 and continued at the Australian National University when the college was amalgamated. He retired in 1971. His attempt at compiling a comprehensive bibliography of Chinese history in Western languages was incomplete at his death, though held in manuscript form at the National Library of Australia, to which he also donated or bequeathed numerous rare books. His work on late imperial China was noted for his work on the bureaucratic system, which was also the topic of his 1957 Morrison Lecture.

Religion 
A convert to the Society of Friends in 1956, he gave the 1973 James Backhouse Lecture, "Friends and Other Faiths."

References

1906 births
1978 deaths
Dutch bibliographers
Dutch political scientists
20th-century Dutch historians
Historians of China
Alumni of the London School of Economics
Dutch expatriates in Canada
Dutch expatriates in China
Dutch expatriates in Australia
Dutch expatriates in the United Kingdom
20th-century political scientists